The Prisoner is a 1962 Australian television play based on a play which had been filmed with Alec Guinness. Many Australian TV dramas at the time were based on overseas stories.

Cast
Christopher Hill as the interrogator
Michael Duffield as the prisoner
John Gray as the cell warden

Production
Sterling aimed to recreate prison through the mind of a prisoner.

Reception
The critic from the Sydney Morning Herald wrote that, "no thumb-screw or rack could have seemed more incredible than did the weapons in the verbal armoury of the interrogator, played so as to be fairly obviously diabolical by Christopher Hill... The camera circled and shifted as ominously as the dialogue; the shadows and lights of William Sterling's production accentuated the probing nightmare; but in the end one was not quite sure how it all had happened."

The Bulletin thought it was "stronger   than   the   motion   picture   in   many  ways."

References

External links
The Prisoner at IMDb

Australian television films
1960s Australian television plays
Films directed by William Sterling (director)